Geoffrey Chapman (5 April 1930 – 9 May 2010) was an Australian publisher. He was the founder of the British publisher Geoffrey Chapman Ltd, which published over 90 ecclesiastical titles.

Geoffrey Chapman Ltd was acquired by Crowell-Collier Macmillan. Crowell-Collier Macmillan later acquired Cassell, of which Geoffrey Chapman became an imprint.

References

1930 births
2010 deaths
Australian publishers (people)